Air Marshal Albert Abraham Lawson Cuffe (2 May 1895 – 24 March 1969) was a Canadian air force officer who was briefly Director of the Royal Canadian Air Force.

Career
Cuffe enlisted in the Canadian Expeditionary Force in 1914 and, having joined the Royal Flying Corps, served in World War I. After the War he became an instructor at Camp Borden. He was responsible for forming No. 2 (Operations) Squadron at High River, Alberta on 1 April 1925. He served briefly as Director of the Royal Canadian Air Force in 1932 before, having been promoted to wing commander, he became Commanding Officer of No.4 Squadron at Vancouver around 1935. He served in World War II in initially as Air Member for Training and then, from February 1942, as Commander of the Eastern Air Command of the Royal Canadian Air Force. He retired in 1944.

References

1895 births
1969 deaths
Royal Canadian Air Force air marshals of World War II